was a renowned Japanese amateur photographer of rural life around the area where he lived in Akita, Japan.

Biography
Chiba was born in Kakunodate, Akita on 19 October 1917, and two years later moved to Yokote, Akita, an area where he would remain. After finishing high school in 1932, he started work in a kimono shop. In 1935 he bought a Rokuoh Baby Pearl camera and started photographing the rural area where he lived, particularly its everyday life, winning prizes.

Immediately after the war Chiba's photographs appeared in the contests pages of Camera and other magazines, and he became a central figure in the photographic culture of Akita (a part of Japan that would attract Ihei Kimura, Hiroshi Hamaya and other photographers). From 1952 Chiba freelanced as an Akita-based photojournalist in his free time, but after half a year's hospitalization he closed his kimono shop and opened a shop in Yokote selling photographic supplies. From around this time Chiba concentrated on photographically documenting the history of the area.

Chiba was hospitalized in October 1965 and died on 29 December 1965. In May of the following year, friends helped organize an exhibition of his posthumous works in Fuji Photo Salon, Tokyo. In 1992 his works were displayed prominently within an exhibition held by the Miyagi Museum of Art of postwar photography in Tōhoku.

The first booklength collection of Chiba's works came over thirty years after his death, in a slim volume of the series Nihon no Shashinka that serves as an anthology.

Bibliography
Chiba Teisuke isakushū. N.p.: Chiba Teisuke Isakushū Kankōkai, 1966. A booklet of Chiba's late works. 
 Chiba Teisuke. Nihon no Shashinka 24. Tokyo: Iwanami, 1998. .

Related works
Nihon kindai shashin no seiritsu to tenkai / The Founding and Development of Modern Photography in Japan. Tokyo: Tokyo Museum of Photography, 1995.

Notes

References
 Matsumoto Norihiko, ed. Nihon no bijutsukan to shashin korekushon (Japan's art galleries and photography collections). Kyoto: Tankōsha, 2002. . 
 Nihon no shashin: Uchinaru katachi, sotonaru katachi 1: Torai kara 1945 made / Japanese Photography: Form In/Out 1: From Its Introduction to 1945. Tokyo: Tokyo Metropolitan Museum of Photography, 1996.  Exhibition catalogue. A potted biography of Chiba appears on p. 124. Text and captions are in Japanese and English (but Chiba isn't shown or mentioned); biographies in Japanese only.
  Nihon no shashinka / Biographic Dictionary of Japanese Photography. Tokyo: Nichigai Associates, 2005. . Pp. 261–2. Despite the English-language alternative title, all in Japanese.
 Sekiji Kazuko. "Chiba Teisuke". Nihon shashinka jiten / 328 Outstanding Japanese Photographers. Kyoto: Tankōsha, 2000. . P.215. Despite the English-language alternative title, all in Japanese.
 Shashinshū o yomu 2: Besuto 338 kanzen gaido (Reading photobooks 2: A complete guide to the best 338). Tokyo: Metarōgu, 2000. .

Japanese photographers
Artists from Akita Prefecture
1917 births
1965 deaths